Kontula metro station is a ground-level station on the M2 line (Tapiola - Mellunmäki) of the Helsinki Metro. There are 273 bicycle and 53 car parking spaces at Kontula. The station serves the district of Kontula in East Helsinki.

Kontula was opened on 21 October 1986 and was designed by architect bureau Toivo Karhunen Oy. It is located 1.4 kilometers north of Myllypuro metro station and 1.6 kilometers west of Mellunmäki metro station.

Pictures

References

External links

Helsinki Metro stations
Railway stations opened in 1986
1986 establishments in Finland